Sosnovaya is a rural locality (a settlement) in Gaynskoye Rural Settlement, Gaynsky District, Perm Krai, Russia. The population was 209 as of 2010. There are 4 streets.

Geography 
Sosnovaya is located 33 km northwest of Gayny (the district's administrative centre) by road. Ust-Veslyana is the nearest rural locality. It is located approximately 10km Northwest from the Kama River.

References 

Rural localities in Gaynsky District